Andrea Dennis (born 3 January 1982, in Oxford) is a former British rower. She was part of the British squad that topped the medal table at the 2011 World Rowing Championships in Bled, where she won a gold medal as part of the lightweight quad sculls with Stephanie Cullen, Imogen Walsh, Kathryn Twyman and Andrea Dennis.

Dennis studied at Reading University.

References

External links
 

1982 births
Living people
English female rowers
Sportspeople from Oxford
World Rowing Championships medalists for Great Britain
Alumni of the University of Reading